Carson Township may refer to the following townships in the United States:

 Carson Township, Fayette County, Illinois
 Carson Township, Cottonwood County, Minnesota